The 2018–19 Miami Heat season was the 31st season of the franchise in the National Basketball Association (NBA).

This was Dwyane Wade's final season, after playing 16 years in the NBA. Believed by many to be the best player in franchise history, Wade led the team to its first championship title in 2006, as well as back-to-back titles in 2012 and 2013. He also led the team to a total of 11 playoff appearances, and Finals appearances in 2011 and 2014. Including his honorary All-Star spot this season, Wade has 13 total NBA All-Star Game appearances to his name.

On March 26, 2019, the Heat retired Chris Bosh's jersey prior to their game versus the Orlando Magic. A free agent since 2017, Bosh officially announced his retirement on February 12, 2019 due to an ongoing battle with blood clots that ended his playing career in 2016.

The Heat were eliminated from playoff contention on April 9th, when the Detroit Pistons defeated the Memphis Grizzlies.

Draft picks

The Heat did not have a pick in the 2018 NBA draft, with their selections having been traded to the Phoenix Suns and Memphis Grizzlies (later Houston Rockets), respectively.

Roster

<noinclude>

Standings

Division

Conference

Game log

Preseason

|- style="background:#fcc;"
| 1
| September 30
| @ San Antonio
| 
| Hassan Whiteside (20)
| Hassan Whiteside (13)
| Olynyk, Wade (4)
| AT&T Center17,024
| 0–1
|- style="background:#fcc;"
| 2
| October 2
| @ Charlotte
| 
| Kelly Olynyk (18)
| Hassan Whiteside (15)
| Goran Dragic (4)
| Spectrum Center8,417
| 0–2
|- style="background:#fcc;"
| 3
| October 5
| @ Washington
| 
| Maten, Winslow (17)
| Hassan Whiteside (9)
| Briante Weber (6)
| Capital One Arena12,825
| 0–3
|- style="background:#cfc;"
| 4
| October 8
| Orlando
| 
| Rodney McGruder (19)
| Hassan Whiteside (13)
| Dragic, McGruder, Johnson (5)
| American Airlines Arena19,600
| 1–3
|- style="background:#cfc;"
| 5
| October 10
| New Orleans
| 
| Bam Adebayo (26)
| Bam Adebayo (12)
| Tyler Johnson (7)
| American Airlines Arena19,600
| 2–3
|- style="background:#cfc;"
| 6
| October 12
| Atlanta
| 
| Josh Richardson (24)
| Dwyane Wade (5)
| Wade, Dragic (5)
| American Airlines Arena19,600
| 3–3

Regular season

|- style="background:#fcc
| 1
| October 17
| @ Orlando
| 101–104
| Goran Dragic (26)
| Hassan Whiteside (18)
| Goran Dragic (4)
| Amway Center19,191
| 0–1
|- style="background:#cfc
| 2
| October 18
| @ Washington
| 113–112
| Josh Richardson (28)
| Hassan Whiteside (10)
| Goran Dragic (8)
| Capital One Arena20,409
| 1–1
|- style="background:#fcc
| 3
| October 20
| Charlotte
| 112–113
| Dwyane Wade (21)
| Hassan Whiteside (15)
| Goran Dragic (7)
| American Airlines Arena19,600
| 1–2
|- style="background:#cfc
| 4
| October 24
| New York
| 110–87
| Hassan Whiteside (22)
| Hassan Whiteside (14)
| Kelly Olynyk (6)
| American Airlines Arena19,600
| 2–2
|- style="background:#cfc
| 5
| October 27
| Portland
| 120–111
| Goran Dragic (28)
| Hassan Whiteside (15)
| Dragic, Richardson (5)
| American Airlines Arena19,600
| 3–2
|- style="background:#fcc
| 6
| October 29
| Sacramento
| 113–123
| Josh Richardson (31)
| Hassan Whiteside (24)
| Goran Dragic (5)
| American Airlines Arena19,600
| 3–3
|- style="background:#fcc
| 7
| October 30
| @ Charlotte
| 113–125
| Dwyane Wade (19)
| Hassan Whiteside (12)
| Justise Winslow (5)
| Spectrum Center14,117
| 3–4

|- style="background:#fcc
| 8
| November 3
| @ Atlanta
| 118–123
| Josh Richardson (32)
| Justise Winslow (10)
| Justise Winslow (8)
| State Farm Arena16,303
| 3–5
|- style="background:#cfc
| 9
| November 5
| @ Detroit
| 120–115 (OT)
| Josh Richardson (27)
| Richardson, Adebayo (8)
| Goran Dragic (6)
| Little Caesars Arena1,4148
| 4–5
|- style="background:#cfc
| 10
| November 7
| San Antonio
| 95–88
| Hassan Whiteside (29)
| Hassan Whiteside (20)
| Josh Richardson (5)
| American Airlines Arena19,600
| 5–5
|- style="background:#fcc
| 11
| November 9
| Indiana
| 102–110
| Kelly Olynyk (20)
| Hassan Whiteside (20)
| Josh Richardson (6)
| American Airlines Arena19,600
| 5–6
|- style="background:#fcc
| 12
| November 10
| Washington
| 110–116
| Josh Richardson (24)
| Hassan Whiteside (14)
| Josh Richardson (5)
| American Airlines Arena19,600
| 5–7
|-style="background:#fcc
| 13
| November 12
| Philadelphia
| 114–124
| Goran Dragic (22)
| Hassan Whiteside (11)
| Goran Dragic (5)
| American Airlines Arena19,600
| 5–8
|- style="background:#cfc;"
| 14
| November 14
| @ Brooklyn
| 120–107
| Tyler Johnson (24)
| Justise Winslow (11)
| Goran Dragic (5)
| Barclays Center13,317
| 6–8
|- style="background:#fcc;"
| 15
| November 16
| @ Indiana
| 91–99
| Josh Richardson (28)
| Hassan Whiteside (17)
| Justise Winslow (6)
| Bankers Life Fieldhouse17,923
| 6–9
|-style="background:#fcc;"
| 16
| November 18
| LA Lakers
| 97–113
| Wayne Ellington (19)
| Bam Adebayo (8)
| Rodney McGruder (4)
| American Airlines Arena19,686
| 6–10
|- style="background:#fcc;"
| 17
| November 20
| Brooklyn
| 92–104
| Hassan Whiteside (21)
| Hassan Whiteside (23)
| Josh Richardson (5)
| American Airlines Arena19,600
| 6–11
|- style="background:#cfc;"
| 18
| November 23
| @ Chicago
| 103–96
| Josh Richardson (27)
| Bam Adebayo (13)
| Wayne Ellington (4)
| United Center20,935
| 7–11
|- style="background:#fcc
| 19
| November 25
| @ Toronto
| 115–125
| Dwyane Wade (35)
| Bam Adebayo (21)
| Dwyane Wade (6)
| Scotiabank Arena19,800
| 7–12
|- style="background:#fcc
| 20
| November 27
| Atlanta
| 113–115
| Josh Richardson (22)
| Hassan Whiteside (10)
| Rodney McGruder (5)
| American Airlines Arena19,600
| 7–13
|- style="background:#cfc
| 21
| November 30
| New Orleans
| 106–101
| Josh Richardson (20)
| Bam Adebayo (11)
| Dwyane Wade (6)
| American Airlines Arena19,600
| 8–13

|- style="background:#cfc
| 22
| December 2
| Utah
| 102–100
| Hassan Whiteside (23)
| Hassan Whiteside (20)
| Dwyane Wade (8)
| American Airlines Arena19,600
| 9–13
|- style="background:#fcc
| 23
| December 4
| Orlando
| 90–105
| Justise Winslow (14)
| Hassan Whiteside (9)
| Josh Richardson (5)
| American Airlines Arena19,600
| 9–14
|- style="background:#cfc
| 24
| December 7
| @ Phoenix
| 115–98
| Bam Adebayo (22)
| Bam Adebayo (10)
| Goran Dragic (10)
| Talking Stick Resort Arena14,273
| 10–14
|- style="background:#cfc
| 25
| December 8
| @ LA Clippers
| 121–98
| Dwyane Wade (25)
| Derrick Jones Jr. (11)
| Justise Winslow (9)
| Staples Center17,113
| 11–14
|- style="background:#fcc
| 26
| December 10
| @ LA Lakers
| 105–108
| Justise Winslow (28)
| Derrick Jones Jr. (14)
| Dwyane Wade (10)
| Staples Center18,997
| 11–15
|- style="background:#fcc
| 27
| December 12
| @ Utah
| 84–111
| Rodney McGruder (16)
| Kelly Olynyk (8)
| Olynyk, Adebayo (3)
| Vivint Smart Home Arena18,306
| 11–16
|- style="background:#cfc
| 28
| December 14
| @ Memphis
| 100–97
| Olynyk, Richardson (18)
| Bam Adebayo (9)
| Josh Richardson (7)
| FedExForum16,313
| 12–16
|- style="background:#cfc
| 29
| December 16
| @ New Orleans
| 102–96
| Josh Richardson (22)
| Hassan Whiteside (12)
| Bam Adebayo (5)
| Smoothie King Center15,535
| 13–16
|- style="background:#cfc
| 30
| December 20
| Houston
| 101–99
| Josh Richardson (22)
| Hassan Whiteside (17)
| Josh Richardson (7)
| American Airlines Arena19,600
| 14–16
|- style="background:#cfc
| 31
| December 22
| Milwaukee
| 94–87
| Josh Richardson (16)
| Hassan Whiteside (13)
| Justise Winslow (5)
| American Airlines Arena19,600
| 15–16
|- style="background:#cfc
| 32
| December 23
| @ Orlando
| 115–91
| Tyler Johnson (25)
| Josh Richardson (10)
| Johnson, Winslow, Adebayo (5)
| Amway Center18,846
| 16–16
|- style="background:#fcc
| 33
| December 26
| Toronto
| 104–106
| Justise Winslow (21)
| Hassan Whiteside (12)
| Josh Richardson (7)
| American Airlines Arena19,902
| 16–17
|- style="background:#cfc
| 34
| December 28
| Cleveland
| 118–94
| Justise Winslow (24)
| Justise Winslow (11)
| Justise Winslow (7)
| American Airlines Arena19,617
| 17–17
|- style="background:#fcc
| 35
| December 30
| Minnesota
| 104–113
| Dwyane Wade (21)
| Hassan Whiteside (13)
| Dwyane Wade (5)
| American Airlines Arena19,600
| 17–18

|- style="background:#cfc
| 36
| January 2
| @ Cleveland
| 117–92
| Josh Richardson (24)
| Hassan Whiteside (12)
| Richardson, Adebayo (5)
| Quicken Loans Arena19,432
| 18–18
|- style="background:#cfc
| 37
| January 4
| Washington
| 115–109
| Hassan Whiteside (21)
| Hassan Whiteside (18)
| Justise Winslow (10)
| American Airlines Arena19,600
| 19–18
|- style="background:#fcc
| 38
| January 6
| @ Atlanta
| 82–106
| Derrick Jones Jr. (14)
| Adebayo, Olynyk (6)
| Rodney McGruder (5)
| State Farm Arena16,630
| 19–19
|- style="background:#fcc
| 39
| January 8
| Denver
| 99–103
| Dion Waiters (15)
| Hassan Whiteside (11)
| Dwyane Wade (6)
| American Airlines Arena19,600
| 19–20
|- style="background:#cfc
| 40
| January 10
| Boston
| 115–99
| Dwyane Wade (19)
| Hassan Whiteside (10)
| Justise Winslow (11)
| American Airlines Arena19,600
| 20–20
|- style="background:#cfc
| 41
| January 12
| Memphis
| 112–108
| Justise Winslow (26)
| Bam Adebayo (10)
| Josh Richardson (9)
| American Airlines Arena19,600
| 21–20
|- style="background:#fcc
| 42
| January 15
| @ Milwaukee
| 86–124
| Winslow, Whiteside (19)
| Hassan Whiteside (8)
| Josh Richardson (5)
| Fiserv Forum17,626
| 21–21
|- style="background:#fcc
| 43
| January 18
| @ Detroit
| 93–98
| Dwyane Wade (20)
| Hassan Whiteside (10)
| Dwyane Wade (8)
| Little Caesars Arena17,228
| 21–22
|- style="background:#cfc
| 44
| January 19
| @ Chicago
| 117–103
| Josh Richardson (26)
| Wade, Whiteside (10)
| Dwyane Wade (7)
| United Center20,926
| 22–22
|- style="background:#fcc
| 45
| January 21
| @ Boston
| 99–107
| Waiters, Jones Jr. (18)
| Derrick Jones Jr. (9)
| Justise Winslow (6)
| TD Garden18,624
| 22–23
|- style="background:#fcc
| 46
| January 23
| LA Clippers
| 99–111
| Hassan Whiteside (22)
| Hassan Whiteside (16)
| Johnson, Richardson (6)
| American Airlines Arena19,600
| 22–24
|- style="background:#cfc
| 47
| January 25
| @ Cleveland
| 100–94
| Justise Winslow (27)
| Hassan Whiteside (13)
| Tyler Johnson (6)
| Quicken Loans Arena19,432
| 23–24
|- style="background:#cfc
| 48
| January 27
| @ N. Y. Knicks
| 106–97
| Wayne Ellington (19)
| Hassan Whiteside (16)
| Dwyane Wade (10)
| Madison Square Garden18,852
| 24–24
|- style="background:#fcc
| 49
| January 30
| Chicago
| 89–105
| Tyler Johnson (15)
| Olynyk, Whiteside (9)
| Waiters, Winslow (5)
| American Airlines Arena19,600
| 24–25

|- style="background:#fcc
| 50
| February 1
| Oklahoma City
| 102–118
| Kelly Olynyk (21)
| Hassan Whiteside (6)
| Dwyane Wade (6)
| American Airlines Arena19,600
| 24–26
|- style="background:#fcc
| 51
| February 2
| Indiana
| 88–95
| Dwyane Wade (21)
| Hassan Whiteside (14)
| Dwyane Wade (6)
| American Airlines Arena19,600
| 24–27
|- style="background:#cfc
| 52
| February 5
| @ Portland
| 118–108
| Hassan Whiteside (28)
| Hassan Whiteside (11)
| Justise Winslow (5)
| Moda Center19,468
| 25–27
|- style="background:#fcc
| 53
| February 8
| @ Sacramento
| 96–102
| Josh Richardson (21)
| Hassan Whiteside (19)
| Justise Winslow (6)
| Golden 1 Center17,583
| 25–28
|- style="background:#fcc
| 54
| February 10
| @ Golden State
| 118–120
| Josh Richardson (37)
| Hassan Whiteside (14)
| Dwyane Wade (9)
| Oracle Arena19,596
| 25–29
|- style="background:#fcc
| 55
| February 11
| @ Denver
| 87–103
| Justise Winslow (15)
| Rodney McGruder (10)
| Josh Richardson (8)
| Pepsi Center18,378
| 25–30
|- style="background:#cfc
| 56
| February 13
| @ Dallas
| 112–101
| Dwyane Wade (22)
| Justise Winslow (11)
| Richardson, Winslow (6)
| American Airlines Center20,364
| 26–30
|- style="background:#fcc
| 57
| February 21
| @ Philadelphia
| 102–106
| Dwyane Wade (19)
| Justise Winslow (7)
| Justise Winslow (6)
| Wells Fargo Center20,505
| 26–31
|- style="background:#fcc
| 58
| February 23
| Detroit
| 96–119
| Dion Waiters (17)
| Hassan Whiteside (15)
| Dion Waiters (5)
| American Airlines Arena19,600
| 26–32
|- style="background:#fcc
| 59
| February 25
| Phoenix
| 121–124
| Hassan Whiteside (29)
| Hassan Whiteside (11)
| Josh Richardson (9)
| American Airlines Arena19,600
| 26–33
|- style="background:#cfc
| 60
| February 27
| Golden State
| 126–125
| Goran Dragić (27)
| Bam Adebayo (10)
| Josh Richardson (5)
| American Airlines Arena19,647
| 27–33
|- style="background:#fcc
| 61
| February 28
| @ Houston
| 118–121
| Olynyk, Dragić (21)
| Justise Winslow (7)
| Justise Winslow (8)
| Toyota Center18,055
| 27–34

|- style="background:#cfc
| 62
| March 2
| Brooklyn
| 117–88
| Kelly Olynyk (25)
| Bam Adebayo (16)
| Waiters, Richardson (7)
| American Airlines Arena19,600
| 28–34
|- style="background:#cfc
| 63
| March 4
| Atlanta
| 114–113
| Dwyane Wade (23)
| Hassan Whiteside (7)
| Wade, Richardson (5)
| American Airlines Arena19,600
| 29–34
|- style="background:#cfc
| 64
| March 6
| @ Charlotte
| 91–84
| Kelly Olynyk (22)
| Kelly Olynyk (11)
| Justise Winslow (7)
| Spectrum Center18,137
| 30–34
|- style="background:#cfc
| 65
| March 8
| Cleveland
| 126–110
| Josh Richardson (20)
| Hassan Whiteside (11)
| Justise Winslow (9)
| American Airlines Arena19,600
| 31–34
|- style="background:#fcc
| 66
| March 10
| Toronto
| 104–125
| Bam Adebayo (19)
| Hassan Whiteside (7)
| Bam Adebayo (5)
| American Airlines Arena19,600
| 31–35
|- style="background:#cfc
| 67
| March 13
| Detroit
| 108–74
| Justise Winslow (16)
| Hassan Whiteside (11)
| Josh Richardson (5)
| American Airlines Arena19,600
| 32–35
|- style="background:#fcc
| 68
| March 15
| Milwaukee
| 98–113
| Justise Winslow (20)
| Bam Adebayo (11)
| Justise Winslow (5)
| American Airlines Arena19,600
| 32–36
|- style="background:#cfc
| 69
| March 17
| Charlotte
| 93–75
| Goran Dragić (19)
| Kelly Olynyk (9)
| Kelly Olynyk (6)
| American Airlines Arena19,600
| 33–36
|- style="background:#cfc
| 70
| March 18
| @ Oklahoma City
| 116–107
| Goran Dragić (26)
| Kelly Olynyk (9)
| Goran Dragić (11)
| Chesapeake Energy Arena18,203
| 34–36
|- style="background:#cfc
| 71
| March 20
| @ San Antonio
| 110–105
| Goran Dragić (22)
| Bam Adebayo (15)
| Bam Adebayo (5)
| AT&T Center18,354
| 35–36
|- style="background:#fcc
| 72
| March 22
| @ Milwaukee
| 87–116
| Hassan Whiteside (14)
| Hassan Whiteside (9)
| Josh Richardson (5)
| Fiserv Forum18,094
| 35–37
|- style="background:#cfc
| 73
| March 23
| @ Washington
| 113–108
| Dwyane Wade (20)
| Bam Adebayo (11)
| Bam Adebayo (8)
| Capital One Arena20,409
| 36–37
|- style="background:#fcc
| 74
| March 26
| Orlando
| 99–104
| Dion Waiters (26)
| Bam Adebayo (11)
| Dwyane Wade (7)
| American Airlines Arena19,704
| 36–38
|- style="background:#cfc
| 75
| March 28
| Dallas
| 105–99
| Goran Dragić (23)
| Bam Adebayo (16)
| Goran Dragić (11)
| American Airlines Arena19,851
| 37–38
|- style="background:#cfc
| 76
| March 30
| @ N. Y. Knicks
| 100–92
| Dion Waiters (28)
| Hassan Whiteside (13)
| Goran Dragić (10)
| Madison Square Garden19,812
| 38–38

|- style="background:#fcc
| 77
| April 1
| @ Boston
| 105–110
| Goran Dragić (30)
| Bam Adebayo (14)
| Dwyane Wade (7)
| TD Garden18,624
| 38–39
|- style="background:#fcc
| 78
| April 3
| Boston
| 102–112
| Dion Waiters (21)
| Hassan Whiteside (15)
| Dwyane Wade (6)
| American Airlines Arena19,904
| 38–40
|- style="background:#fcc
| 79
| April 5
| @ Minnesota
| 109–111
| Dwyane Wade (24)
| Whiteside, Dragić, Winslow (7)
| Goran Dragić (9)
| Target Center17,763
| 38–41
|- style="background:#fcc
| 80
| April 7
| @ Toronto
| 109–117 (OT)
| Dwyane Wade (21)
| Bam Adebayo (13)
| Dragić, Winslow (6)
| Scotiabank Arena19,800
| 38–42
|- style="background:#cfc
| 81
| April 9
| Philadelphia
| 122–99
| Dwyane Wade (30)
| Whiteside, Adebayo (9)
| Goran Dragić (13)
| American Airlines Arena20,153
| 39–42
|- style="background:#fcc
| 82
| April 10
| @ Brooklyn
| 94–113
| Dwyane Wade (25)
| Wade, Haslem (11)
| Dwyane Wade (10)
| Barclays Center17,732
| 39–43

Player statistics

|-
| align="left"| || align="center"| C
| style=";"|82 || 28 || 1,913 || 597 || 184 || 71 || 65 || 729
|-
| align="left"|≠ || align="center"| PF
| 10 || 0 || 44 || 9 || 2 || 1 || 0 || 7
|-
| align="left"| || align="center"| PG
| 36 || 22 || 991 || 111 || 174 || 30 || 5 || 494
|-
| align="left"|† || align="center"| SG
| 25 || 12 || 533 || 47 || 29 || 24 || 3 || 209
|-
| align="left"| || align="center"| C
| 10 || 1 || 74 || 27 || 2 || 0 || 0 || 25
|-
| align="left"| || align="center"| PF
| 55 || 33 || 1,164 || 176 || 135 || 35 || 27 || 428
|-
| align="left"|† || align="center"| PG
| 44 || 10 || 1,123 || 121 || 112 || 40 || 21 || 475
|-
| align="left"| || align="center"| SF
| 60 || 14 || 1,153 || 240 || 37 || 46 || 42 || 422
|-
| align="left"| || align="center"| PF
| 2 || 0 || 13 || 3 || 0 || 1 || 0 || 2
|-
| align="left"|‡ || align="center"| SG
| 66 || 45 || 1,550 || 238 || 112 || 36 || 12 || 503
|-
| align="left"| || align="center"| PF
| 79 || 36 || 1,812 || 375 || 140 || 53 || 37 || 787
|-
| align="left"| || align="center"| SG
| 73 || style=";"|73 || style=";"|2,539 || 263 || 298 || style=";"|79 || 34 || style=";"|1,209
|-
| align="left"| || align="center"| PF
| 15 || 1 || 161 || 19 || 5 || 5 || 0 || 50
|-
| align="left"| || align="center"| PF
| 1 || 0 || 3 || 1 || 1 || 0 || 0 || 1
|-
| align="left"| || align="center"| SG
| 72 || 2 || 1,885 || 285 || style=";"|301 || 59 || 38 || 1,083
|-
| align="left"| || align="center"| SG
| 44 || 28 || 1,138 || 116 || 121 || 29 || 9 || 527
|-
| align="left"| || align="center"| C
| 72 || 53 || 1,674 || style=";"|817 || 56 || 46 || style=";"|136 || 887
|-
| align="left"| || align="center"| SF
| 66 || 52 || 1,959 || 355 || 282 || 72 || 19 || 830
|}
After all games.
‡Waived during the season
†Traded during the season
≠Acquired during the season

Transactions

Free agents

Re-signed

Additions

Subtractions

References

Miami Heat seasons
Miami Heat
Miami Heat
Miami Heat